Saosin is an American rock band formed in Orange County, California in 2003 by Beau Burchell, Justin Shekoski, Zach Kennedy, and Anthony Green. The band released their first EP, Translating the Name, in 2003. That year, vocalist Anthony Green left Saosin due to personal reasons, and was replaced by Cove Reber in 2004. With Reber, the group recorded their self titled debut album, released on Capitol Records in 2006. 

Their second studio album, In Search of Solid Ground, was released in 2009 on Virgin Records and contains three re-recorded tracks from The Grey EP. In 2010, Reber was dismissed from the band. The band reformed in 2013 with all original members except Kennedy, and began touring. They released Along the Shadow, their third studio album and first studio album with Green, in 2016 through Epitaph Records.

Saosin emerged from the emo and post-hardcore scenes during the early 2000s, and has been regarded for their harmonizing vocals, lead guitar riffs with delays and natural harmonics as a form of creating melodies.

Origin of name
Anthony Green had initially suggested the name "Saosin" for the band. Saosin means "careful" in Chinese (小心 xiǎo xīn). The word comes from a 15th-century proverb about fathers admonishing their sons who are being married off for money to not get emotionally involved with their wives, as they could die at any time. Green explained the meaning behind this as being a reference to the fact that nothing is eternal, and that it is a mistake to become overly attached to anyone or anything, because that thing will eventually be lost. While Green's personal interpretation of the word 小心 is obscure, 小心 is generally used in Chinese as a means to express caution. Green had previously used "Saosin" as a track name in his high school band, Audience of One, I Remember When This All Meant Something.

History

Formation and Translating the Name (2003–2004)
The original lineup for Saosin, consisting of Burchell, Shekoski, Kennedy and Green, was formed in the summer of 2003. On June 17, the band released their first commercial production, the EP Translating the Name. It was an immediate success and was immensely popular on online forums and music sites.

Saosin first became popular through promotion and exposure through the Internet. They became known for their distinct musical styles long before their first studio-length album was released, and were popularized on social networking and music sites such as MySpace. The EP has sold an estimated 62,000 copies.

Bassist Zach Kennedy left the band early on, as he wanted to pursue a career in art. He was later replaced by Chris Sorenson. 
A local Southern Californian drummer by the name of Pat Magrath  was hired only for the recording for the EP, according to Burchell. The band was impressed with his drumming skills, however, and he later appeared as a guest performing Lost Symphonies live with the band. Alex Rodriguez was unable to record Translating the Name as he had promised his band at the time Open Hand he would finish recording with them. Danny King filled in for live drums with the band before Rodriguez completed his responsibilities with Open Hand and joined Saosin full-time after the EP release. Saosin went on a U.S. tour with bands Boys Night Out and Anatomy of a Ghost shortly after the release of Translating the Name.

In February 2004, the band's vocalist Anthony Green left Saosin and later formed the band Circa Survive. Green was homesick, depressed and said he was missing his family. Green was also disenchanted with the direction of Saosin and disliked that the band excluded him from the writing process. The band finished their Warped Tour obligations with Story of the Year's Philip Sneed taking the mic. A public, nationwide audition then took place.

Translating the Name was viewed as "expanding the limits" of the post-hardcore genre and rewriting the music scene. Alternative Press noted that with the release of the EP, Saosin stirred the underground and had many labels scurrying to sign them.

Arrival of Cove Reber and Saosin EP (2004–2006)
After the audition process and several guest vocalists on demos, the then 19-year-old Cove Reber was announced as their new permanent lead singer. Reber had sent in his demo tape, which was an acoustic demo with "Mookie's Last Christmas". The demo has since leaked onto the internet. It is widely speculated to have included a few songs from Translating the Name. When Beau Burchell first heard the demo, he thought it was Anthony playing a trick on them, as Reber's vocal stylings were very similar to those of Green's when the demo was originally recorded.

In an interview with Euphonia Online, Reber commented that "everyone I've played with wants to make music their lives...Saosin is a band on a completely different level. All these dudes are freaks about music."

Reber's addition to the band was difficult, for the more experienced Green was the center piece of the band in the eyes of Saosin's fans. Many fans consider the time with Green to be something entirely different from the time with Reber. There are still distinct fans of both eras (Green Era/Reber Era) debating on which is a better fit for the band as a whole.

Saosin played the first Taste of Chaos tour the following winter with The Used, My Chemical Romance, Killswitch Engage, Senses Fail and Static Lullaby. Saosin was signed to Capitol Records in March and toured the United States with the Warped Tour for the second time. That summer, they released the Saosin EP. At first it was intended to be a free sampler, but Capitol Records would not allow this and released it as an EP. It contained demo versions of songs later recorded on their first full-length album. A video to their new single "Bury Your Head" was filmed during the tour. The band continued touring for the rest of 2005, opening for Avenged Sevenfold and Coheed and Cambria.

Saosin LP and Come Close (2006–2008) 
After a respite from touring between February and June, the Warped Tour 2006 and numerous demos and compilation appearances, Saosin released their first full-length album Saosin on September 26, 2006. The well-known music producer Howard Benson was hired for the production of the album. Benson had worked with several major rock bands such as My Chemical Romance and Blindside. The guitar riffs on the album were listed on Alternative Press's "Best Guitar Riffs of 2000s Rock." The first single, "Voices" was listed on the Top 46 post-hardcore songs of the 2000s, and the second single "You're Not Alone" was listed on the Top 10 Essential Emo Power Ballads by the Alternative Press.

During the rest of 2006, Saosin toured on the International Taste of Chaos Tour, playing their first shows outside of America. They also toured the United States with Bleeding Through and Senses Fail. They kept on touring for the whole year of 2007, beginning with a tour with Senses Fail, Alexisonfire, The Sleeping and Drop Dead, Gorgeous. Saosin also invited the non-profit organization Invisible Children for a portion of the tour. In February they joined the Taste of Chaos 2007 tour. Between April and June they toured in Europe, Australia, Japan and Indonesia.When Saosin returned home they continued their headlining tour with Poison the Well, The Receiving End of Sirens, Fiore and Flight 409. In the later summer of 2007, they were part of Linkin Park's Projekt Revolution tour.
After this they headlined yet another tour in USA and Canada with Alexisonfire, Envy on the Coast, Norma Jean and The Dear and Departed. Concert footage was recorded during the tour stop on November 3, 2007 at The Theater of Living Arts in Philadelphia, Pennsylvania. The concert footage was compiled for a live album and concert movie entitled Come Close.

Saosin toured from January 26 to February 8, 2008 with Armor for Sleep, Meriwether, and The Bled; from February 9 to 16 Fear Before joined the tour. They went to Australia between February and March, after which they performed in Singapore on March 7 as the opening performance for Incubus on their Light Grenades Tour. On their way home they also visited Bali, Hawaii and Mexico. After two final shows at home in California in April, they took a nine-month break from touring.

The Grey EP and In Search of Solid Ground (2008–2010)
Saosin returned to touring in October 2008 alongside Underoath and The Devil Wears Prada.

In early 2009, they started recording a new album with producer Butch Walker. They partnered with Hurley to broadcast the recording process live on Hurley's website.

Saosin released a new EP titled The Grey EP on October 14, 2008. The EP was sold on tour and on iTunes and featured three new demos, as well as an acoustic version of "Come Close". The purpose of The Grey EP was to show demos they had been recording; a similar manner in which the Saosin EP contained demos for their debut LP.

Saosin released In Search of Solid Ground on September 8, 2009. Two songs were released as a download to anyone who bought a shirt, and a digital pre-order. The songs were "On My Own" and "Is This Real". These two songs were released as singles on iTunes August 4, 2009. On August 5 a new song titled "Changing" was made available for streaming on the internet. The single was then put up for download on iTunes August 11. Another track titled "The Worst of Me" was also released as part of a free Warped Tour song package on hurley.com/warpedtour. The song "Why Can't You See?" was made available on Last.fm.

"Move Slow" was released on the TV show, NCISs original soundtrack. "Deep Down" was released in May 2010.

Saosin toured Australia nationally during June 2010 in support of Story Of The Year's Australian tour. Blessthefall also joined Story Of The Year and Saosin.

Three unreleased Saosin songs have leaked onto the internet through the Hurley Live Recording Stream they broadcast while recording In Search of Solid Ground. Fans have titled them "The Norma Jean Song," "Back to Greatness" and the third is still known as "Untitled".

The band stated on Twitter that they have parted ways with Virgin Records and are going back into a "DIY" direction.

The departure of Cove Reber and inactivity (2010–2014)

On July 21, 2010, guitarist Beau Burchell made the following announcement: "Well, a few days ago, Alex, Justin, Chris and I got back into the studio for our first group writing/jam session. We have all been writing things on our own, but it was cool to get into a room and play with loud amps all together again. I am very excited about this record, for a few different reasons. After 5 years with Cove, we have decided to part ways. So it will be a new experience for us, not knowing what to expect in the vocal dept, who will replace him, or if we will even find a replacement this century." Reber was asked to leave due to his diminishing stage performance and vocal abilities. According to Justin Shekoski, "We didn't feel he could represent the music that we have recorded well on stage."

Cove Reber is now lead vocalist for the band Dead American. "finished Two NEW Songs, Instrumentals, ones called JUD JUD JUD. Lots of Riffs, Rolls and ROFLCOPTERS. Might put one up in a few days. STOKED! - Beau"

On November 25, it was reported that Charles Furney, lead singer of Secret and Whisper, had been recruited to fill Reber's abandoned vocalist spot. One day later, on November 26, Saosin themselves denied these claims on their Facebook page:
<blockquote>Thanks for the update from strike gently But, unfortunately, we DO NOT have a new singer yet, and its not Chris from Secret & Whisper. INFORMATION POLLUTION!- SAOSIN</blockquote>
There has been speculation that Tides of Man vocalist, Tilian Pearson, will audition for Saosin's vacant position. Pearson confirmed rumors that he was kicked out of Tides of Man due to him expressing an interest in pursuing the vacant lead vocalist role in Saosin. Justin Shekoski has also confirmed the speculation and clarified by saying: "Here's the truth, since I can't stand rumors. Tilian has been hitting us up. A lot. It looks like he wants the job pretty badly if he would quit his band. BUT....the REALITY is we haven't even met the guy in person. Everybody is talking about step No. 54 (joining the band).

A new demo was leaked on the internet, fuelling speculation that Pearson had joined the band and begun recording. In an interview with Mind Equals Blown, Pearson revealed that the leaked demo is a track Saosin bassist Chris Sorenson had been working on, and that he was asked to provide vocals for it.

In an interview with Alternative Press, Pearson gave an update on his status with Saosin, and cleared up the rumor of him being an official Saosin member. There were no further announcements of Pearson doing a record with Saosin, nor was there any announcement of him being added as an official member.

On February 23, 2012, the band's Twitter account confirmed that they were no longer in search of a new vocalist.

On November 18, 2012, Saosin tweeted a picture with the caption "Studio stuff #hewfring", dispelling rumours of the band's break-up which had begun to circulate due to their inactivity.

On December 16, 2012 Anthony Green was joined on stage by Beau and Justin for an encore where they played 'Seven Years'. Green stated it was the first time in nearly ten years that they had played together.

On February 21, 2013, Saosin updated their Facebook status "To satisfy those who wish to hear more about Saosin, We have written 14 songs. When they are ready, you will be the first to know."

A second Tilian Pearson-fronted demo, recorded over the instrumental originally released as a bonus track on the iTunes version of ISOSG entitled "Exfoliator," was posted to YouTube on May 7, 2013.

Anthony Green was interviewed by AltPress regarding his former group, Saosin, celebrating their ten-year anniversary of Translating The Name EP. In this particular segment, Green was asked if he would ever rejoin Saosin, he said "I love those songs and I love singing “Seven Years” when I play solo. I'm not opposed to talking about doing anything in the future. If the timing was right and it was for the right reasons, then I think it could be something really special".

On January 25, 2014, Beau Burchell tweeted a photo from Hurley Studios indicating that he was tracking drums with Alex Rodriguez.

 Anthony Green return, Along the Shadow, line-up changes (2014–present) 
It has been announced that Saosin is performing the Skate and Surf festival on May 17, 2014 and West Coast tour on early June 2014 with original vocalist Anthony Green.

The band hinted in an interview with Alternative Press that there may be a possible future together with Anthony.

The band toured again from January 19, 2015 to January 25, 2015 with Anthony Green on vocals, and played two new songs, as well as stating they are in the process of completing a new full-length album.
 
After 13 years together Justin Shekoski and Saosin parted ways. Phil Sgrosso of then-Wovenwar (now As I Lay Dying) will handle lead guitar parts during the upcoming east coast tour for the band. 

During their 2016 spring tour, Saosin announced that their new album would be released on May 20.  

On March 16, 2016, they released their music video "The Silver String", which additionally confirmed that their album Along The Shadow would be available May 20.

On April 6, 2016, they released their second music video called "Racing Toward A Red Light, which is another track from the upcoming album Along The Shadow. 

On April 27, 2016, they released their third music video "Control and the Urge to Pray", which is the third track released from the upcoming album Along The Shadow.

On May 20, 2016, Saosin released "Along the Shadow" on Epitaph Records.

On December 16 and 17, 2018, Saosin played at Glass House, Pomona, where the band reunited with their ex-frontman Cove Reber for two shows. They performed "Voices", "You're Not Alone" and a "Seven Years" duo with Reber and Green. It was the first time in eight years the band had performed on stage with Reber since his departure in 2010.

In 2020, Saosin released four singles with Anthony Green's vocals: a revamped version of their early demo "I Can Tell There Was an Accident Here Earlier" and three versions of "Mookie's Last Christmas" - remixes by Monogram Sound and Jeremy Sh Griffith, and an acoustic version.

On November 10, 2022, it was announced that Saosin would embark on their first Australian headlining tour in March 2023.

Musical style
Saosin has been described as post-hardcore, emo, indie rock, and alternative rock.

Band members

Current members
 Beau Burchell – rhythm guitar, backing vocals (2003–present), piano, keyboards (2003–2008), lead guitar (2015–present)
 Chris Sorenson – bass, backing vocals (2003–present), piano, keyboards (2003–2008, 2014–present)
 Alex Rodriguez – drums, percussion (2004–present)
 Anthony Green – lead vocals, additional guitars (2003–2004, 2014–present)

Current touring musicians
 Phil Sgrosso – lead guitar (2016–present)

Former members
 Zach Kennedy – bass (2003)
 Cove Reber – lead vocals, piano, keyboards, additional guitar and live percussion (2004–2010)
 Justin Shekoski – lead guitar, backing vocals (2003–2015)

Former touring musicians
 Danny King – drums, percussion (2003)
 Philip Sneed – lead vocals (2004)
 Ken Floyd – guitar (2010)

Session musicians
 Pat Magrath – drums, percussion (2003, on Translating the Name)
 Tilian Pearson – vocals (2011, on demos)

Timeline

Discography

Studio albums
 Saosin (2006)
 In Search of Solid Ground (2009)
 Along the Shadow '' (2016)

References

External links

 
 Interview of Saosin by Euphonia Online

Capitol Records artists
Epitaph Records artists
Virgin Records artists
Musical groups from Orange County, California
American post-hardcore musical groups
Emo musical groups from California
Musical groups established in 2003
American screamo musical groups